Engelbert König (18 October 1884 – 10 September 1951) was an Austrian football player, and later a manager.

König was a well-built player and was known for playing a very physical game. On October 29, 1911 he was playing for WAF against SK Rapid Wien when he tackled Josef Jech injuring his kneecap, so badly that he had to be transported to the hospital. The Rapid fans invaded the pitch and chased and chased the WAF players into their cabin. On a previous occasion he also injured Viktor Löwenfeld.

Player career
He played as a forward, beginning his club career with the Vienna Cricket and Football-Club in July 1905. In July 1911 he moved on to Wiener AF, remaining there until June 1913. Then he moved to SC Germania Schwechat, until he retired as a player in 1920.

References

1884 births
1951 deaths
Austrian footballers
Association football forwards
Austria international footballers